The law of restitution is the law of gains-based recovery, in which a court orders the defendant to give up their gains to the claimant. It should be contrasted with the law of compensation, the law of loss-based recovery, in which a court orders the defendant to pay the claimant for their loss.

Evolving Meaning 
American Jurisprudence 2d edition notes:

Legal vs Equitable Remedy 
Restitution may be either a legal remedy or an equitable remedy, "depend[ing] upon the basis for the plaintiff's claim and the nature of the underlying remedies sought". Generally, restitution and equitable tracing is an equitable remedy when the money or property wrongfully in the possession of defendant is traceable (i.e., can be tied to "particular funds or property"). In such a case, restitution comes in the form of a constructive trust or equitable lien.

Where the particular property at issue cannot be particularly identified, restitution is a legal remedy. This occurs, for example, when the plaintiff "seeks a judgment imposing personal liability to pay a sum of money". Unjust enrichment and quantum meruit are sometimes identified as types of a disgorgement legal remedies.

This type of damages restores the benefit conferred to the non-breaching party. Put simply, the plaintiff will get the value of whatever was conferred to the defendant when there was a contract. There are two general limits to recovery, which is that a complete breach of contract is needed, and the damages will be capped at the contract price if the restitution damages exceed it.

Differing Views on Restitution 
The orthodox view suggests that there is only one principle on which the law of restitution is dependent, namely the principle of unjust enrichment. However, the view that restitution, like other legal responses, can be triggered by any one of a variety of causative events is increasingly prevalent.  These are events in the real world which trigger a legal response.  It is beyond doubt that unjust enrichment and wrongs can trigger an obligation to make restitution. Certain commentators propose that there is a third basis for restitution, namely the vindication of property rights with which the defendant has interfered. It is arguable that other types of causative event can also trigger an obligation to make restitution.

For wrongs 

Imagine that A commits a wrong against B and B sues in respect of that wrong.  A will certainly be liable to pay compensation to B.  If B seeks compensation then the court award will be measured by reference to the loss that B has suffered as a result of A's wrongful act.  However, in certain circumstances it will be open to B to seek restitution rather than compensation.  It will be in B's interest to do so if the profit that A made by his wrongful act is greater than the loss suffered by B. Or in some circumstances, the lost good "G" carries a more value to B than the actual cost of "G". For example, B possesses a rare book of say, 14th century [G], which cost only Rs 10 in that period. A has illegally stolen G [from B] and has destroyed it. Currently very few samples of G exist in the world, yet since its demand is not much, G still costs Rs 10. Since very few samples exist in the world, it is near impossible to find a person from whom G could be bought. In such a circumstance, B is entitled to get Rs 10 from A under the law of torts. However B might prefer to apply law of restitution instead [waiver of torts], and claim that he needs a copy of G rather than Rs. 10.

Whether or not a claimant can seek restitution for a wrong depends to a large extent on the particular wrong in question.  For example, in English law, restitution for breach of fiduciary duty is widely available but restitution for breach of contract is fairly exceptional.  The wrong could be of any one of the following types:

 A statutory tort
 A common law tort
 An equitable wrong 
 A breach of contract
 Criminal offences

Notice that (1)–(5) are all causative events (see above).  The law responds to each of them by imposing an obligation to pay compensatory damages.  Restitution for wrongs is the subject which deals with the issue of when exactly the law also responds by imposing an obligation to make restitution.

Example
In Attorney General v Blake, an English court found itself faced with the following claim.  The defendant had made a profit somewhere in the region of £60,000 as a direct result of breaching his contract with the claimant.  The claimant was undoubtedly entitled to claim compensatory damages but had suffered little or no identifiable loss.  It therefore decided to seek restitution for the wrong of breach of contract.  The claimant won the case and the defendant was ordered to pay over his profits to the claimant.  However, the court was careful to point out that the normal legal response to a breach of contract is to award compensation. An order to make restitution was said to be available only in exceptional circumstances.

To reverse unjust enrichment

Cases of intentional torts or breaches of fiduciary duty often allow for claims of unjust enrichment, as well as cases of statutory torts and breaches of contract.  A plaintiff can even have a claim in unjust enrichment when there is no other substantive claim.

In the United States, the Uniform Commercial Code ("UCC") entitles a buyer who defaults restitution of the buyer's deposit to the extent it exceeds reasonable liquidated damages or actual damages. If the contract does not have a liquidated damages clause, the UCC provides a statutory sum: 20% of the price or $500, whichever is less, and the buyer who defaulted is entitled to restitution of any excess.

United Nations level
 The United Nations Convention against Corruption (UNCAC) – Working Group on Asset Recovery
 The UNCAC Coalition of Civil Society Organisations
 The World Bank – Stolen Asset Recovery Initiative (StAR)

See also 

 Blood money
 Equity (legal concept)
 Quasi-contract
 Reparations
 Restitution (theology)

Notes

Further reading
 
 
 
 
 

 
Judicial remedies
Reparations
Transitional justice